Gordon Axel Madsen (born 1929) is a former state legislator and assistant attorney general in Utah.  He is currently working as a co-editor of the business and legal papers in the Joseph Smith Papers Project.  Madsen is married to Carol Cornwall Madsen.

Madsen was born to Axel A. Madsen and his wife the former Emily Wells Grant in Salt Lake City. His mother died about two weeks after his birth. He was raised by his father, his grandparents Heber J. Grant and wife Augusta Winters (his mother's step-mother) and various six sisters of his mother and their families, all living within just a few houses of each other in the Avenues section of Salt Lake City. Madsen is the younger brother of noted Latter-day Saint scholar and philosopher Truman G. Madsen.

Madsen has B.S. and J.D. degrees from the University of Utah.  Early in his career, he served as a district attorney and then assistant attorney general in Utah.  He served in the latter position from 1959 to 1964.  Since 1964, he has been a lawyer in private practice.

From 1969 to 1971, Madsen served as a member of the Utah House of Representatives.

Madsen in 1990 and 2004, published articles in BYU Studies about trials involving Joseph Smith.  Madsen has also worked as an adjunct faculty member at Brigham Young University's J. Reuben Clark Law School.

Madsen is a Latter-day Saint.  In a 1996 presentation to the Mormon History Association, he presented evidence that he said demonstrated that William Law's accusations of fraud against Joseph Smith, Jr. were false.

Gordon and Carol Madsen are the parents of six children.

Sources 
 Joseph Smith papers project contributors bio

Latter Day Saints from Utah
University of Utah alumni
Members of the Utah House of Representatives
Brigham Young University faculty
Utah lawyers
Living people
S.J. Quinney College of Law alumni
District attorneys in Utah
1929 births